Zach Ville (born April 24, 1982) is a former American football defensive end. Ville played college football for the Missouri Tigers.  He was signed by the Kansas City Chiefs as an undrafted free agent in 2005, and participated in training camp with the team before being released.  He was allocated to the NFL Europa by the Chiefs in January 2006.  He played two seasons (2006–07) for the NFL Europa's Rhein Fire, totaling five sacks and 37 tackles for loss from the defensive end position.  He played for the Saskatchewan Roughriders of the Canadian Football League in 2007.  Prior to the start of the 2008 Arena football season he was signed by the Grand Rapids Rampage.

References

External links
Just Sports Stats
Missouri Tigers bio

Living people
1982 births
American football defensive ends
Canadian football defensive linemen
American players of Canadian football
Missouri Tigers football players
Rhein Fire players
Saskatchewan Roughriders players
Grand Rapids Rampage players
Cleveland Gladiators players
Players of American football from Miami
Players of Canadian football from Miami